Joyce Randolph ( Sirola; October 21, 1924) is an American actress, best known for playing Trixie Norton on the television sitcom The Honeymooners.

Early life and career
Randolph was born in Detroit, Michigan on October 21, 1924. As a teenager, she acted with the Wayne University Workshop. After she finished high school, she began working in retail sales for a Saks Fifth Avenue store in Detroit. When a touring company of Stage Door played in Detroit, she auditioned, got a part, and performed for the rest of the tour. She moved to New York City in 1943 to pursue an acting career. She took roles on Broadway and landed various television roles.

In 1951, she was seen in a Clorets commercial by Jackie Gleason and was asked to appear in a skit on Cavalcade of Stars, Gleason's variety show on the DuMont Television Network. Soon after, she was cast as Trixie in The Honeymooners. Several New York columnists referred to her as the "Garbo of Detroit". "That's still a mystery ... I was a nobody in Detroit. Why Garbo? Well, she was Scandinavian — and so was I", responded Randolph.

The Honeymooners
Randolph is the last surviving cast member of The Honeymooners which included Jackie Gleason as Ralph Kramden, Art Carney as Ed Norton, Audrey Meadows as Alice Kramden, and Randolph as Thelma "Trixie" Norton.

Randolph also portrayed Trixie in skits on The Jackie Gleason Show. In a September 2015 interview, Randolph said that she did not portray Trixie Norton in Honeymooners revivals due to personal and geographic reasons; in addition, Randolph stated that Gleason considered her to be "the quintessential Trixie."

As claimed by Randolph, asking Gleason to give her more lines was out of the question. “You don’t even talk to Jackie, let alone ask for anything,” Randolph said. "He didn’t talk much and he didn’t like to rehearse much.”  Joyce talked about a hectic workload for filming the show, with getting all 39 episodes shot within a calendar year. Though she stated there was not much conversation between cast members, everyone showed up on Saturdays to film the show in front of a live studio audience.

Other career
On Broadway, Randolph appeared in Ladies Night in a Turkish Bath (1950). After she became identified with the Norton character, she seldom found other parts. "For years after that role," Randolph said, "directors would say: 'No, we can't use her. She's too well known as Trixie." She performed in summer stock musicals, made commercials, and had a few guest appearances on TV shows, including her reprisal of Trixie Norton (along with Audrey Meadows reprising her role as Alice Kramden) in the 1991 episode "Fur Flies" in Hi Honey, I'm Home!.

Personal life

Randolph married Richard Lincoln Charles, a wealthy marketing executive, on October 2, 1955, the day after The Honeymooners premiered. Richard Charles died in 1997 at age 74. Their son, Randolph Richard Charles (born 1960), is a marketing executive.

She is the great-aunt of former  Major League Baseball pitcher Tim Redding.

References

External links

Joyce Randolph, The Last-Surviving 'Honeymooner'

 

1924 births
Living people
Actresses from Detroit
American stage actresses
American television actresses
American people of Finnish descent
20th-century American actresses
21st-century American actresses
Members of The Lambs Club